Tribes (Latin tribus) were groupings of citizens in ancient Rome, originally based on location. Voters were eventually organized by tribes, with each Roman tribe having an equal vote in the Tribal Assembly.

Original tribes
Latin tribus perhaps derives from the Latin word for "three", trēs. The Romans believed that through much of the early regal period of Roman history, there were only three tribes:
Ramnes
Tities
Luceres
These names were also preserved in the names of six of the later centuries of Roman equites.

Later tribes
Livy records that in 495 BC the number of tribes was increased to 21, and the number of tribes reached 35 in 242 BC and was not expanded further.

Urban tribes
Attributed by Livy to the sixth Roman king, Servius Tullius, the urban tribes were named for districts of the city and were the largest and had the least political power. In the later Republic, poorer people living in the city of Rome itself typically belonged to one of these tribes. Freedmen were also traditionally assigned to one of these tribes.
Collina
Esquilina
Palatina
Suburana

Rural tribes

Landowners and aristocracy traditionally belonged to the 31 smaller rural tribes. Many rural tribes derive from prominent Roman gentes, or family names, such as Cornelia or Fabia.
Aemilia
Aniensis
Arniensis
Camilia
Claudia
Clustumina
Cornelia
Fabia
Falerna/Falerina
Galeria
Horatia
Lemonia
Maecia
Menenia
Oufentina/Oufetina
Papiria
Poblilia
Pollia
Pomptina/Pontina
Pupinia
Quirina
Romilia
Sabatia/Sabatina
Scaptia
Sergia
Stellatina
Teretina
Tromentina
Velina
Voltinia/Votinia
Voturia

The official order of the tribes

There was an official order of the tribes. Literature and archaeological documentation show that the urban tribes are enumerated according to a counter-clockwise circuit of the city. On that basis, Lily Ross Taylor suggested that the same held for the rural tribes.

Archaeological findings of tesserae led Michael Crawford to suggest that the tribes were ordered according to the principal roads leading counter-clockwise from Rome (Ostiensis, Appia, Latina, Praenestina, Valeria, Salaria, Flaminia and Clodia).

See also
 List of Roman gentes

Notes

Footnotes

References

External links
https://web.archive.org/web/20100315164204/http://www.roman-britain.org/roman_tribes.htm 
Names of the Roman Tribes, Names of the 35 Major Roman Voting Tribes, By N.S. Gill, About.com Guide

Lists of ancient Indo-European peoples and tribes
Tribes